The Invisible Girl is an upcoming Spanish mystery thriller televisions series based on La chica invisible, the first installment of young adult book trilogy by . It stars Zoe Stein and Daniel Grao.

Premise 
Set in the fictional sleepy Andalusian village of 'Cárdena', the plot follows a daughter and her father, both involved in the investigation pertaining the murder of a teenage girl.

Cast

Production 
The series is based on the novel by Blue Jeans and its writing team includes Carmen López-Areal, Marina Efron, Antonio Hernández Centeno, Ramón Tarrés, and Ian de la Rosa. Tito López Amado and  took over direction duties.

Release 
Beta Film nabbed international distribution rights elsewhere than North America, Latin America, Asia-Pacific and Iberia. The Invisible Girl received a pre-screening at Carmona's . The 8-episode season is set to be released in Spain on Disney+ on 15 February 2023.

References 

Upcoming television series
Spanish mystery television series
Spanish drama television series
Spanish thriller television series
Television shows filmed in Spain
Television shows set in Andalusia
Television series based on Spanish novels